Abd ol Reza (also Romanized as ‘Abd ol Reẕā; also known as Ḩājj ‘Abd ol Reẕā) is a village in Ahudasht Rural District, Shavur District, Shush County, Khuzestan Province, Iran. At the 2006 census, its population was 129, in 19 families.

References 

Populated places in Shush County